"Smoke a Little Smoke" is a song co-written and recorded by American country music singer Eric Church. It was released in June 2010 as the third and final single from his 2009 album Carolina. It was also the eighth single of Church's career to reach the top 20 on the U.S. Billboard Hot Country Songs chart after peaking at number 16. Church wrote this song with Jeff Hyde and Driver Williams.

Critical reception
Karlie Justus of Engine 145 gave the song a "thumbs-up", saying that it "puts Church's bravado posturing to good use." She also praised the song's production, saying that it "makes no attempts to temper the song’s spot-on snapshot of trying to lose one’s self[…]in an effort to awkwardly make the project 'country.'" In his review of the album, Jonathan Keefe of Slant Magazine said that the song had "an interesting rhythm track[…]that actually reinforce[s] the tones." Country Standard Time reviewer Jeffrey B. Remz called it a "stark [reminder] that Church is making a valiant attempt to rekindle the outlaw movement." In 2017, Billboard contributor Chuck Dauphin put "Smoke a Little Smoke" at number eight on his top 10 list of Church's best songs.

Music video
Church began filming the song's music video in July 2010. The video includes Church driving vintage cars at Clarksville Speedway, and includes a cameo from NASCAR driver Kasey Kahne. Of the video, Church said that he wanted to "show something[…] that [the fans] haven't seen before." The video was directed by Peter Zavadil.

Chart performance
"Smoke a Little Smoke" first charted in mid-2009 as an album cut, spending one week at number 57 on the Hot Country Songs charts. In June 2010, it re-entered the same chart also at number 57. The song was a minor top 20.

Year-end charts

Certifications

References

2010 singles
2009 songs
Eric Church songs
Songs written by Eric Church
Music videos directed by Peter Zavadil
Capitol Records Nashville singles
Song recordings produced by Jay Joyce
Songs written by Jeff Hyde
Songs about cannabis